The 1991 SCCA Escort World Challenge was the second running of the Sports Car Club of America's World Challenge series. It was the final year under sponsorship from Escort radar detectors. The series would not find another corporate sponsor until television network SpeedVision bought the series in 1999. The race in Mexico would be their final race outside of North America (i.e. the United States and Canada) until their race in Puerto Rico twelve years later. The series also added a Super Sport group alongside its World Challenge and Super Production groups. The series would also adopt a 24-hour race at Mosport Park.

Results

References

GT World Challenge America